Mira Boumejmajen (born June 6, 1995) is a French artistic gymnast. She competed at the 2012 Summer Olympics.

References

External links
 

1995 births
Living people
French female artistic gymnasts
Olympic gymnasts of France
Gymnasts at the 2012 Summer Olympics
People from Vierzon
Mediterranean Games silver medalists for France
Competitors at the 2013 Mediterranean Games
Sportspeople from Cher (department)
Mediterranean Games medalists in gymnastics
21st-century French women